Ngāti Awa is a Māori iwi (tribe) centred in the eastern Bay of Plenty Region of New Zealand. It is made of 22 hapū (subtribes), with 15,258 people claiming affiliation to the iwi in 2006. The Ngāti Awa people are primarily located in towns on the Rangitaiki Plain, including Whakatāne, Kawerau, Edgecumbe, Te Teko and Matatā. Two urban hapū also exist in Auckland (Ngāti Awa-ki-Tamaki) and Wellington (Ngāti Awa-ki-Poneke).

History

Early history

Ngāti Awa traces its origins to the arrival of Māori settlers on the Mātaatua waka (canoe). The Mātaatua settlers established settlements in the Bay of Plenty and Northland. Initially, the tribe controlled a large area in Northland, but conflicts with other northern iwi resulted in a southward migration. One group eventually settled in the eastern Bay of Plenty, whose descendants would eventually found the iwi.

Awanuiarangi II is recognised as the eponymous ancestor of Ngāti Awa. Awanuiarangi II was a chief descended from Toroa, captain of the Mātaatua. Descendants of Awanuiarangi II eventually formed their own iwi, Ngāti Awa, named after their ancestor.

Tribal and land wars

Ngāti Awa was frequently at war with neighbouring iwi, including those with similar ancestry. Ngāti Awa initially had good trading relations with European settlers. However, the New Zealand Wars of the 1860s resulted in the British Crown confiscating more than 1,000 km² of Ngāti Awa land.

For more than a century afterwards, Ngāti Awa remained an aggrieved, struggling people. However, in 1999, the Waitangi Tribunal determined that the confiscation of Ngāti Awa land in the New Zealand Wars by the British Crown was illegal, and in 2003 a settlement was reached between Ngāti Awa and the New Zealand Government.

In the nineteenth century Ngāti Pūkeko were considered a separate iwi, but they are currently considered a hapū of Ngāti Awa.

Government settlement

In 2003, following almost ten years of negotiations between the New Zealand Government and Ngāti Awa, a settlement was announced and reparations were made to the iwi. In summary:
The New Zealand Government ('the Crown') acknowledged and apologised for the illegal confiscation of Ngāti Awa land during the New Zealand Wars
The Crown paid NZ$42.39 million in reparations to Ngāti Awa
The Crown agreed to return control of seven sites of historical and cultural significance to the iwi
Three locations were renamed in accordance with original Ngāti Awa place names.
On settlement the Ngāti Awa Research Centre that was established in 1989 to generate research for the Waitangi Tribunal claim became Ngāti Awa Research and Archives.

Hapū and marae

Whakatāne hapū

The following hapū are based around Whakatāne and Coastlands:

 Ngāti Hokopū, based at Te Hokowhitu a Tū ki te Rāhui marae and Te Hokowhitu a Tūmatauenga wharenui, and at Te Whare o Toroa marae
 Ngāti Wharepaia, based at Te Hokowhitu a Tū ki te Rāhui marae and Te Hokowhitu a Tūmatauenga wharenui and Te Whare o Toroa marae
 Te Patuwai me Ngāti Maumoana, based at Toroa marae
 Warahoe, based at Tokitareke marae and Te Puna o Te Orohi wharenui
 Ngāi Te Rangihouhiri II, based at Te Rangihouhiri II marae
 Ngāi Taiwhakaea II, based at Taiwhakaea marae and Taiwhakaea II wharenui

Poroporo hapū

The following hapū are based around Poroporo and Paroa:

 Ngāti Pūkeko, based at Pūkeko marae
 Ngāti Rangataua, based at Rangataua marae
 Ngāti Tamapare, based at Rewatu marae and Ueimua wharenui
 Te Whānau o Tariao Tapuke, based at Rangimarie marae and Rarawhati wharenui
 Ngāti Hikakino, based at Puawairua marae

Te Teko hapū

The following hapū are based around Te Teko and Edgecumbe:

 Ngā Maihi, based at Tūteao marae
 Ngāi Tamaoki, based at Ruaihona marae
 Ngāi Tamawera, based at Uiraroa marae
 Ngāti Hāmua, based at Te Māpou marae and Rongotangiawa wharenui
 Te Pahipoto, based at Kokohinau (Tuhimata) marae and Oruatapare wharenui
 Tuariki, based at Tuariki marae
 Te Kahupāke, based in the area of Te Teko

Matatā and Motiti hapū

The following hapū are based around Matatā and on Motiti Island:

 Te Tāwera, based at Iramoko marae and Te Paetata wharenui, in Matatā
 Te Patuwai me Ngāti Maumoana, based at Te Hinga o te Ra marae, and at Te Rua Kopiha marae and Tamatea ki te Huatahi wharenui, on Motiti Island

Urban hapū

The following urban hapū are affiliated with Ngāti Awa:

 Ngāti Awa ki Poneke, based at Te Tumu Herenga Waka marae at Victoria University in Wellington
 Ngāti Awa ki Tāmaki Makaurau, based at Mātaatua marae and Awanuiarangi wharenui, at Māngere in Auckland

Governance

Te Rūnanga o Ngāti Awa

Te Rūnanga o Ngāti Awa became the new governing body of the iwi in 2005. Representatives from the Rūnanga were responsible for negotiating the settlement with the government on behalf of Ngāti Awa. Based in Whakatāne, the rūnanga manages the financial assets of the iwi, and promotes cultural, educational and economic development in the region.

The trust manages the tribe's Treaty of Waitangi settlement under the Ngāti Awa Claims Settlement Act and is a body corporate for the tribe's land, under Te Runanga o Ngāti Awa Act. It represents the iwi in aquaculture and fisheries under the Māori Commercial Aquaculture Claims Settlement Act, and represents the iwi during resource consent consultation under the Resource Management Act. The trust is governed by one representative from each of the 22 hapū, and is based in Whangarei.

Local government

The tribal area of the iwi is within the territory of Kawerau District Council and Whakatāne District Council.

It is also within the wider territory of the Bay of Plenty Regional Council.

Media

Sun FM

Sun FM is the radio station for Ngāti Awa. It was first known as Te Reo Irirangi o Te Manuka Tutāhi during a three-week AM trial run in 1990. It went to air as Tumeke FM in 6 April 1991, became Sun FM in 1994 to increase its advertising appeal, and between 1996 and 1999 worked to increase its Māori language content.

Notable people

 Wepiha Apanui
 Leni Apisai
 Mere Broughton
 Catherine Carran
 Tāmati Coffey
 Samuel Horouta Emery
 Wira Gardiner
 Ngapiki Hakaraia
 Joe Harawira
 Matekoraha Te Peehi Jaram
 Georgina Kingi
 Karl Leonard
 Eruera Riini Manuera
 Hamiora Tumutara Te Tihi-o-te-whenua Pio
 Dan Pryor
 Kara Pryor
 Linda Tuhiwai Smith
 Albert Oliphant Stewart
 Te Hura Te Taiwhakaripi
 Maata Te Taiawatea Rangitukehu
 Eruera Hamiora Tumutara
 Gugi Waaka
 Te Kari Waaka
 Carin Wilson

See also
List of iwi
Ngā Mānawa

References

 
Iwi and hapū